The 1970 Tennessee State Tigers football team represented Tennessee State University as an independent during the 1970 NCAA College Division football season. In their eighth season under head coach John Merritt, the Tigers compiled a perfect 10–0 record, defeated Southwestern Louisiana in the 1970 Grantland Rice Bowl, and outscored all opponents by a total of 396 to 144. The team was also recognized as the 1970 black college national champion and was ranked No. 5 in the final 1970 NCAA College Division football rankings issued by both the Associated Press and United Press International.

Tackle Vernon Holland received first-team honors on the 1970 Little All-America college football team.

Schedule

References

Tennessee State
Tennessee State Tigers football seasons
Black college football national champions
Grantland Rice Bowl champion seasons
College football undefeated seasons
Tennessee State Tigers football